Pterostylis alobula, commonly known as the winter greenhood, is a species of orchid endemic to New Zealand. As with similar greenhoods, the flowering plants differ from those which are not flowering. The non-flowering plants have a rosette of leaves flat on the ground but the flowering plants have a single flower with leaves on the flowering spike. This greenhood has pale green and white-striped flowers, similar to those of another New Zealand greenhood, P. trullifolia but are larger and paler in colour.

Description
The dorsal sepal and petals are fused, forming a hood or "galea" over the column with its tip usually horizontal. The lateral sepals are erect, held closely against the galea and have a broad V-shaped sinus between their bases. The labellum is red, curved and projects above the sinus. Flowering occurs from March to October.

Taxonomy and naming
The winter greenhood was first formally described in 1968 by Edwin Hatch and given the name Pterostylis trullifolia var. alobula. The description was published in Transactions and Proceedings of the Royal Society of New Zealand. In 1968 it was raised to species status by Lucy Moore. The specific epithet (alobula) is derived from the Latin word lobus meaning "an elongated projection or protuberance", "capsule" or "pod"  with the prefix a- meaning "without".

Distribution and habitat
The winter greenhood usually grows in sparse leaf litter under shrubs in forest but sometimes also in scrub or pasture. It occurs on both main islands of New Zealand and on some of the offshore islands.

References

alobula
Endemic orchids of Australia
Orchids of New Zealand
Plants described in 1968